Mahendra Varsani (born 21 February 1989) is an Indian producer, director and screenwriter of Gujarati-Hindi films, best known for the film Neelkanth (film) (2012).

Early life and education

Mahendra Varsani also known as Mahendra Samatrai was born on 21 February 1989 in Bhuj to a Kutchi Leva Patel family. Mahendra did his graduation in business management at N. R. Institute of Business Management - Ahmedabad. He was very studious in his education life and received honors with various awards in his school & college life. In school & college days he was involved with various cultural activities including play and dancing. After completed graduation, he went London - UK for study of master in business management. After completed post graduation study in London, he switch his interest from business management to media works.

Career
Mahendra Varsani's first Screenwriter and directorial venture was Neelkanth (film) (2012) which is considered a cult classic. Neelkanth is a feature film based on childhood story of Swaminarayan. The film has true inspiring story of 11 years old teenage yogi, "Neelkanth", who renounced his home and took an extraordinary spiritual - incredible pilgrimage on the foot across the length and breath of India. This is story of struggle, determination, kindness, courage, compassion, austerity, adventure, faith, fearlessness and survival of child. Neelkanth received 8 awards and 14 nominations in categories ranging from the film itself to its direction, cinematography, screenplay, music and acting. The film was released in India and overseas. The film was generally well received by both critics and the mass audience and was a box office success.

After the huge success of Neelkanth, he has done many commercial and non-commercial advertisement, live performances, etc.

Work & Contribution

Awards

For Neelkanth (film) 
Neelkanth received 6 awards and 14 nominations in categories ranging from the film itself to its direction, cinematography, screenplay, music and acting.

Honor and award received from Mrs. Anandiben Patel, Hon'ble Chief Minister of Gujarat
He has received honor and award from Mrs. Anandiben Patel, Hon'ble Chief Minister of Gujarat at Kutch Carnival, Bhuj - Gujarat on date 28 February 2015.

References

External links
  on Facebook
  on Google+
  on Twitter
  on IMDb

1989 births
Living people
Gujarati-language film directors
Indian male screenwriters
Gujarati film producers
Film producers from Gujarat